Becky Hollow is a valley in Oregon County in the U.S. state of Missouri.

Becky Hollow has the name of Rebecca "Becky" Willoby, an early settler.

References

Valleys of Oregon County, Missouri
Valleys of Missouri